Kensington Gardens Apartment Complex is a historic apartment complex located at Buffalo in Erie County, New York. It was built in 1941–1942 and is a multi-unit apartment complex containing a total of 280, one-, two- and three-bedroom apartments in a variety of detached and semi-attached buildings in the Colonial Revival style. The 59 contributing buildings are grouped around grassed courts. There are 10 court areas created on the site and three building types within courts.  It is an example of a World War II-era worker housing community built with financing by the Federal Housing Administration (FHA). 

It was listed on the National Register of Historic Places in 2010.

References

Residential buildings on the National Register of Historic Places in New York (state)
Colonial Revival architecture in New York (state)
Residential buildings completed in 1942
Buildings and structures in Buffalo, New York
1942 establishments in New York (state)
National Register of Historic Places in Buffalo, New York